Polakis may refer to:

 Pavlos Polakis (born 1965), a Greek surgeon and politician
 Thomas A. Polakis (born 1961), an American amateur astronomer

See also 
 4078 Polakis, asteroid named after the astronomer